Mahayeon Hermitage (마하연터, 摩訶衍址) was a Korean Buddhist hermitage, located at Naegeumgang-ri, Kumgang-gun, Kangwon-do, North Korea. This structure was located at an altitude of 846m, the highest point of the Manpok-dong Valley of Mount Geumgang and was a branch hermitage of the Yujomsa temple.

Paintings (Joseon period) 
Mahayeon was depicted by several Korean painters. Among them:

Kim Hong-do <마하연 (摩訶衍)> as #43 in the  《Geumgang Four Counties Album 금강사군첩(金剛四郡帖)》, 1788
Kim Ha-jong, <마하연 (摩訶衍)> as #17 of the 《Haesando Album》, 1815

Japanese colonial period

The #12 (1932) of the "Joseon historical site walk" contains several views of each temple around Mt. Geumgang, Mahayeon among them. Moreover, the area became a touristic destination, leading to the publication of illustrated guides. These pictures taken during the Japanese colonial period are precious since many of these buildings are no longer extant.

Destruction

During the Korean war, the Bombing of North Korea dropped a total of 635,000 tons of bombs, including 32,557 tons of napalm, on Korea. "Every installation, facility, and village in North Korea [became] a military and tactical target", and the orders given to the Fifth Air Force and Bomber Command was to "destroy every means of communications and every installation, factory, city, and village".
As a result, this hermitage has been destroyed by the US bombings of the area.

References

Sources

  15 volumes.

 

 . 10 volumes, 2800 pages. What is said about Jeongyangsa can be accessed through this Naver link.

 
 

Buddhist temples in North Korea